Damascenones are a series of closely related chemical compounds that are components of a variety of essential oils.  The damascenones belong to a family of chemicals known as rose ketones, which also includes damascones and ionones.  beta-Damascenone is a major contributor to the aroma of roses, despite its very low concentration, and is an important fragrance chemical used in perfumery.

The damascenones are derived from the degradation of carotenoids.

In 2008, (E)-β-damascenone was identified as a primary odorant in Kentucky bourbon.

Biosynthesis

The biosynthesis for β-damascenone begins with farnesyl pyrophosphate (FPP) and isopentenyl pyrophosphate (IPP) reacting to produce geranylgeranyl pyrophosphate (GGPP) Figure 1. Next two molecules of GGPP are condensed together to produce phytoene by removal of diphosphate and a proton shift catalyzed by the enzyme phytoene synthase (PSY). Phytoene then goes through a series of desaturation reactions using the enzyme phytoene desaturase (PDS) to produce phytofluene then ζ-carotene. Other enzymes have been found to catalyze this reaction including CrtI and CrtP.
The next series of desaturation reactions is catalyzed by the enzyme ζ-carotene desaturase (ZDS) to produced neurosporene followed by lycopene. Other enzymes that are able to catalyze this reaction include CtrI and CrtQ. Next lycopene goes through two cyclization reactions with the use of the enzyme lycopene β-cyclase first producing γ-carotene followed by the second cyclization producing β-carotene as shown in Figure 2. The mechanism for the cyclization of lycopene to β-carotene is shown in Scheme 2.
 Next β-carotene reacts with O2 and the enzyme β-carotene ring hydroxylase producing zeaxanthin.
Zeaxanthin then reacts with O2, NADPH (H+), and reduced ferredoxin [iron-sulfur] cluster in the presence of the enzyme zeaxanthin epoxidase (ZE) to produce antheraxanthin which reacts in a similar fashion to produce violaxanthin. Violaxanthin then reacts with the enzyme neoxanthin synthase to form neoxanthin the main precursor for β-damascenone as shown in Figure 3.
In order to generate β-damascenone from neoxanthin there are a few more modifications needed. First neoxanthin undergoes an oxidative cleavage to create the grasshopper ketone. The grasshopper ketone then undergoes a reduction to generate the allenic triol. At this stage there are two main pathways the allenic triol can take to produce the final product. The allenic triol can undergo a dehydration reaction to generate either the acetylenic diol or the allenic diol. Finally one last dehydration reaction of either the acetylenic diol or the allenic diol produces the final product β-damascenone as shown in Figure 4. The proposed mechanism for the conversion of the allenic triol to the acetylenic diol is shown in Scheme 3. The proposed mechanism for the conversion of the acetylenic diol to the final product is shown in Scheme 4. This mechanism is known as a Meyer-Schuster rearrangement.

See also
 Rose oil

References

Carotenoids
Enones
Perfume ingredients
Cyclohexadienes